Derek John Mulvaney   (26 October 1925 – 21 September 2016), known as John Mulvaney and D. J. Mulvaney, was an Australian archaeologist. He was the first qualified archaeologist to focus his work on Australia.

Life
Mulvaney was born in Yarram, Victoria, on 26 October 1925.

He began his academic career at the University of Melbourne in Roman history, writing an MA thesis on State and Society in Britain at the time of Roman conquest. In consciously preparing himself to begin the field of Australian archaeology, he entered Clare College, Cambridge as an undergraduate, studying British, Irish, German and Danish prehistoric archaeology. He obtained his PhD from Cambridge in 1970.

His first excavation in Australia was at Fromm's Landing (Tungawa) on the Murray River in South Australia, from 1956 to 1960. 

During his academic career, he co-authored and/or edited 17 books. He was for many years a Commissioner of the Australian Heritage Commission. He was elected a Fellow of the Australian Academy of the Humanities in 1969, the year of its foundation, serving on its Council from 1972 to 1974 and again, this time as Honorary Secretary, from 1989 to 1996.

Mulvaney died in Canberra at the age of 90 on 21 September 2016.

Legacy
Known as the "father of Australian archaeology", Mulvaney was the "first university-trained archaeologist to make Australia his field of study".

In March 2019 the Australian Academy of the Humanities launched the John Mulvaney Fellowship for Aboriginal and Torres Strait Islander early career researchers working in the humanities.

The John Mulvaney Book Award was established by the Australian Archaeological Association in 2004 in honour of Mulvaney, "to acknowledge the significant contribution of individual or coauthored publications to Australian archaeology, either as general knowledge or as specialist publications". In 2018, Deep Time Dreaming: Uncovering Ancient Australia by Billy Griffiths (which describes some of Mulvaney's work and applauds the way he "[built] bridges between the disciplines of history and archaeology") won the award, and in 2019, Alice Gorman's Dr Space Junk vs the Universe: Archaeology and the Future won the award.

Awards
 Fellow of the Australian Academy of the Humanities, 1969
 Companion of the Order of St Michael and St George (CMG), 1982
 Officer of the Order of Australia (AO), 1991
 Grahame Clark Medal of the British Academy, 1999
Centenary Medal, 2001
Rhys Jones Medal, 2004

Works

References

Further reading
Mulvaney, D. J. (Derek John) (1925-2016) - all Trove resources

Vale Emeritus Professor John Mulvaney (ANU, 22 September 2016)
Emeritus Professor John Mulvaney AO CMG (1925-2016) (Australian Archaeological Association)
John Mulvaney, former ANU professor and Australia's 'father of archaeology', dies aged 90 (ABC, 22 Sep 2016)

1925 births
2016 deaths
Australian archaeologists
Officers of the Order of Australia
Australian Companions of the Order of St Michael and St George
Recipients of the Centenary Medal
Alumni of Clare College, Cambridge
University of Melbourne alumni
Academic staff of the University of Melbourne
Academic staff of the Australian National University
Recipients of the Grahame Clark Medal
Corresponding Fellows of the British Academy